Northalsted Market Days is an annual two-day festival in Chicago, Illinois, United States. Established in 1982, it's the Midwest's largest street festival with annual attendance exceeding 300,000 people over the two-day event. It takes place in the Boystown section of Lakeview along North Halsted Street from Belmont Avenue to Addison Avenue and is a half-mile long. The festival consists of 3 music stages, 2 local band stages and a dance floor. The festival showcases food and merchandise tents. There are also Halsted business establishment tents, as well as those of radio stations, public service organizations & companies (SAAB in 2008). Many give away small souvenir items.

The overall flavor of the event is decidedly geared toward the LGBT community, but is open to all. The street remains closed from Saturday at 7am to Monday at 1am. Most of the businesses along Halsted Street are open during the day and stay open late each night when the festival ends for the day. Most notably the 20+ bars and restaurants see a significant increase in patronage.

2006 was the 25th Anniversary for North Halsted Market Days, and helping celebrate were such performers as Billie Myers, Brazilian Girls, Powder, East Village Opera Company and Michael McDermott.

2008 performers included '80s pop group Exposé and Broadway singer Jennifer Holliday. In 2011, singers Darren Criss  and Gloria Gaynor performed at the festival. In 2012, Olivia Newton-John, Sheena Easton, and the Pointer Sisters performed. In 2015, headliners included Salt-N-Pepa, En Vogue and Aaron Carter, among other notable performers.

There was no Market Days in 2020.

Notable performers

10,000 Maniacs
A Flock of Seagulls
Aaron Carter
Adam Barta
Alex Newell 
Alexis Jordan
All-4-One
Andy Bell
Betty Who
Belinda Carlisle
Berlin
Big Freedia
Billie Myers
Blake Lewis
Blu Cantrell 
Blush
Bonnie McKee 
Brian Justin Crum
C + C Music Factory
CeCe Peniston
Charice
Cherie Currie
Chi Chi LaRue
Crystal Waters
Darren Criss
David Cassidy
David Hernandez
Deborah Cox
Diana King
En Vogue
Erika Jayne 
Exposé
Ferras
Frenchie Davis
Gina Glocksen
Gloria Gaynor
Icona Pop
Inaya Day
Jack & Jack
Jake Miller 
Jennifer Holliday
Jessica Sutta
Jill Sobule
Joan Jett
Jody Watley
Jon Secada
Judy Tenuta
Karmin
Kat Graham
Kerli 
Kimberley Locke
Kristine W
La Bouche
Leslie Jordan
Linda Clifford
Lisa Lisa
Lynda Carter
Manila Luzon
Margaret Cho
Martha Wash
Mary Lambert
MAX
Maxine Nightingale
Mimi Imfurst
Neon Trees
Nina Flowers
Olivia Newton-John
Paris Bennett
Prince Poppycock
RJD2
Robin S.
Rockell
Salt-N-Pepa
Sheena Easton
Shiny Toy Guns
Sir the Baptist
Steve Grand
Taylor Dayne
The Cover Girls
The Pointer Sisters
Thea Austin
Tiffany
Todrick Hall
Tony Hadley
Trenyce
Trixie Mattel
Ty Herndon
Ultra Nate
The Village People
(We Are) Nexus
Who Is Fancy 
Wilson Phillips
Wynter Gordon

References

External links
 Special Events Market Days Website
 NortHalsted Market Days Website

Festivals in Chicago
LGBT culture in Chicago
Street fairs